Friend or Foe is the debut solo album by English singer and musician Adam Ant, released in October 1982 by Epic Records in the United States and CBS Records elsewhere. The album peaked at number 5 in the UK, Adam Ant's highest charting solo album.

Release 
Following the disbandment of the successful Adam and the Ants earlier in 1982, Adam Ant began a solo career with fellow "Ant" guitarist and songwriter Marco Pirroni.

Like their previous band, which achieved 7 top-10 hits (2 at No. 1) in the UK Singles chart and the best-selling album of 1980 (Kings of the Wild Frontier), Ant's debut single "Goody Two-Shoes" was a smash hit. The single reached No. 1 in the UK and Australia in June 1982 and No. 12 in the US - Ant's first US hit single. The single "Friend or Foe" was released one month prior to the album in September 1982 and charted as high as No. 9 in the UK.

The album Friend or Foe, was released in October 1982 and reached No. 5 on the UK Albums Chart and No. 16 on the US Billboard Album Chart, becoming Adam Ant's most successful solo album, and was certified Gold by the BPI for sales in excess of 100,000 copies. In addition to "Goody Two-Shoes" & "Friend or Foe", the album included another hit single:  and "Desperate But Not Serious" (UK No. 33 / US No. 66).

A remastered version of the album was released in 2005, featuring twelve additional tracks.

Ant performed the album live on tour in the UK in late 2019.  A United States tour planned for 2020 was postponed because of the COVID-19 pandemic and is currently scheduled for April 2021.

Track listing

Personnel 

 Adam Ant – vocals, bass guitar, production
 Marco Pirroni – guitar, production, vocals on "Man Called Marco"
 Bogdan Wiczling – drums, percussion
 Martin Drover – trumpet, flugelhorn
 Jeff Daly – saxophone
 Jude Kelly - vocals on "Desperate But Not Serious"
 Sam Brown, Sonia Jones, Vicki Brown - backing vocals on "Hello, I Love You"
Technical
Alan Douglas - engineer
Allan Ballard - front cover photography

Chart positions

References

External links 

 

Adam Ant albums
1982 debut albums
CBS Records albums
Columbia Records albums